Zoria, formerly Afiny, is a village in Donetsk Oblast, Ukraine.

Since the October Revolution, it has been a Soviet kolkhoz with few inhabitants in the area of Mariupol amongst the villages of the native minority of the Greeks of Mariupol, which was very large amongst the Greeks in Russia and the Soviet Union. The inhabitants were almost all from the local Tatar-speaking Greek minority. It was renamed Zoria in 1945, but it still keeps the name "Afiny" for the local minority of the Greeks.

References

Villages in Mariupol Raion
Greek diaspora in Ukraine
Cooperatives in Ukraine